Waide Simon Fairhurst (born 7 May 1989) is an English professional footballer who most recently played for Barton Town. He previously played in the Football League with Doncaster Rovers, Shrewsbury Town, Southend United, Hereford United and Macclesfield Town.

Playing career
Fairhurst made his debut for Doncaster Rovers in a 1–0 loss against Coventry City in March 2009, coming on as substitute for Mark Wilson in the 84th minute. He made his home debut one month later in the 2–0 win against Crystal Palace, replacing Kazenga LuaLua with half an hour to go and setting up James Hayter for the second goal. In the 2009–10 season, Fairhurst made his first start for the club against West Bromwich Albion and managed to score seven minutes into the game. His second start came against Ipswich Town, during which he once again opened the scoring.

In October 2009, Fairhurst signed for Shrewsbury Town on a one-month loan deal. He equalised for Shrewsbury Town on his debut against Aldershot. He scored again to help Shrewsbury Town beat Telford United 2–1 and regain the Shropshire Senior Cup. Later his loan deal was extended until early January 2010. Fairhurst scored his fourth league goal for the Shrews during the home match against Macclesfield Town on Boxing Day, but picked up a foot injury in the same match. With this expected to keep him sidelined for three weeks, Shrewsbury decided not to extend the loan deal further.

On 6 October 2010, Fairhurst joined Southend United on a one-month loan deal. On 10 February 2011 he joined Hereford United on an initial months loan, scoring twice on his debut against Cheltenham Town.

On 19 July 2011, it was confirmed that Fairhurst had signed a two-year contract with Macclesfield Town.

Fairhurst signed on a free transfer for Lincoln City on 17 May 2013.

On 31 January 2014, Fairhurst rejoined Macclesfield Town on a one-month loan deal, having only left the club six months earlier. After being released by Lincoln in March, he finished the season with Whitehawk in the Conference South. He rejoined Macclesfield on a permanent deal in the summer, finishing the 2014–15 season as the club's leading goalscorer with 13 goals in all competitions.

In January 2016 he left Torquay United citing personal reasons.

He signed for F.C. Halifax Town on 6 February 2016.

He joined Boston United in June 2016, where he scored once in 14 league appearances.

In January 2017 he joined Frickley Athletic.

In January 2018 he joined Brighouse Town FC. In March 2018, he moved on to join Sheffield FC. Fairhurst was on the move again in November 2018 when he joined Handsworth FC, scoring 11 goals in 24 games (10 goals in 22 games in the league). He then had a short spell at Maltby Main, before returning to Handsworth on 21 September 2019. One month later, Fairhurst left Handsworth having played three games in all competitions without scoring. He joined Barton Town, scoring five goals in 17 appearances in all competitions.

Career statistics

References

External links

1989 births
Living people
Footballers from Sheffield
English footballers
Association football midfielders
Association football forwards
Doncaster Rovers F.C. players
Solihull Moors F.C. players
Shrewsbury Town F.C. players
Southend United F.C. players
Hereford United F.C. players
Macclesfield Town F.C. players
Lincoln City F.C. players
Whitehawk F.C. players
Torquay United F.C. players
FC Halifax Town players
Boston United F.C. players
Frickley Athletic F.C. players
Sheffield F.C. players
Handsworth F.C. players
Maltby Main F.C. players
Barton Town F.C. players
English Football League players
National League (English football) players